Maine Chance Farm was an American Thoroughbred horse racing stable in Lexington, Kentucky owned by cosmetics tycoon Elizabeth Arden.

Elizabeth Arden raced under the nom de course "Mr. Nightingale" until 1943 when she adopted the name Maine Chance Farm from her health spa in Mount Vernon, Maine. During the nineteen forties and fifties, the Maine Chance Farm racing stable was a major force in American horse racing. Among the stable's many champions and stakes race winners who raced under Arden's cerise, blue and white colors were the colt Star Pilot and the filly, Beaugay, both 1945 American national champions. The Beaugay Handicap at Aqueduct Racetrack is named in the filly's honor. That year, Maine Chance Farm was the top money-winning stable in the United States.

In May 1946, a fire at a racetrack in Chicago destroyed twenty-two horses owned by Maine Chance Farm. The stable's two-year-old star colt Jet Pilot survived as he had been shipped to another racetrack. Two future Hall of Famers, trainer Tom Smith and jockey Eric Guerin, worked for Maine Chance Farm and in 1947, Jet Pilot won the Kentucky Derby. In 1948, Ace Admiral won the prestigious Travers Stakes and in 1954 the Maine Chance filly Fascinator won the Kentucky Oaks. In 1960, the farm bred future Hall of Fame colt Gun Bow.

In 1956, Elizabeth Arden acquired the  northern portion of Coldstream Stud on the death of owner E. Dale Shaffer and renamed it Maine Chance Farm. Following Arden's passing in 1966, the farm property became part of the College of Agriculture at the University of Kentucky.

In 2005, the University of Kentucky began the Equine Initiative Project. This project was started by the UK College of Agriculture to develop their Equine Science program into a nationally outstanding program. In 2007, the Maine Chance Farm was being revamped into a Collegiate Equestrian mecha-center, which was expected to feature a breeding program, equestrian center, and equine disease and research center.

References
Maine Chance Farm at the University of Kentucky website
 May 6, 1946 TIME magazine article on Elizabeth Arden's stable racing at Churchill Downs titled Lady's Day in Louisville

American racehorse owners and breeders
Owners of Kentucky Derby winners
Horse farms in Kentucky
Companies based in Lexington, Kentucky
University of Kentucky